Spyros Stefanidis (born 18 December 1946) is a Greek former professional footballer who played as a defender.

Club career
Stefanidis started his career in 1966 at Panserraikos and played in every position in the defence, winning the second division league in his group, as well as the promotion to the first division in 1972. In the summer of 1973 AEK was trying in every way to secure the signature of Sakis Zarzopoulos from Panserraikos. The president of the yellow-blacks, Giannis Theodorakopoulos, submitted a proposal for Stefanidis as well in order to outbid the proposal of Olympiacos. Nevertheless, Stefanidis ultimately proved to be a very useful alternative to the team's defensive line. He remained at AEK for three seasons, and in the summer of 1977 he left as he had lost his position in the roster of the club, after František Fadrhonc relocated Lakis Nikolaou as a center-back, Petros Ravousis had matured and showed very good elements, the transfer of Babis Intzoglou from Panionios, as well as the presence of Stefanos Theodoridis and Giorgos Skrekis in the defensive line of the team. Stefanidis signed at Atromitos, playing in the second division for two more seasons after the team was relegated in the summer of 1977, before retiring at the age of 32.

Honours

Panserraikos
Beta Ethniki: 1971–72 (Third Group)

References

1946 births
Living people
Greek footballers
Super League Greece players
Panserraikos F.C. players
AEK Athens F.C. players
Atromitos F.C. players
Association football defenders
Footballers from Serres